Lady Lotus (also known as Lotus Newmark) is a fictional supervillain appearing in American comic books published by Marvel Comics.

Publication history
Lady Lotus first appeared in The Invaders #37 (Feb. 1979), and was created by Don Glut, Rick Hoberg, Chic Stone and Alan Kupperberg.

Fictional character biography
Lady Lotus was born in Japan, and exhibited strong psychic powers at a young age. She developed these abilities through constant meditation, and supplemented her powers with the sacred lotus flower. At the age of 21, she moved to the United States. Following the Japanese attack on Pearl Harbor, the United States began holding Japanese-Americans in concentration camps to determine their loyalties. Disgusted by this, Lady Lotus took refuge in New York's Chinatown and opened a curio shop called "The House of Lotus". She cast a subtle hypnotic suggestion over anyone who came into the store, convincing her customers that she was actually Chinese. Angered at how her people were being treated by the Americans, she vowed to destroy the United States, and allied with the Axis Powers.

When U-Man was about to attempt an attack upon the Sub-Mariner's flagship, he was suddenly compelled away by the mental powers of Lady Lotus, who commanded him to come to her lair. When U-Man arrived at the House of Lotus, Lady Lotus sent her guards to test his strength, and was impressed. When U-Man tried to fight back against her, he was powerless because of her mental abilities. She told him she was interested in the Kid Commandos team member, Golden Girl. With her powers, she made sure that Japanese saboteurs would make an attempt at the Santa Monica Pier which would be stopped by the Kid Commandos. After they had beaten the saboteurs, she sent U-Man to capture Golden Girl and he brought her back to a warehouse at Lady Lotus's request. There, Golden Girl was treated with utmost respect and was even offered tea as Lady Lotus retold her story to her. She attempted to appeal to their common Japanese ancestry so they could work together to take over the U.S., but Golden Girl was unshaken in her commitment to America, despite what she and her father, Dr. Sam Sabuki, had suffered. Lady Lotus tried to take over her mind, but one of Golden Girl's blasts of energy blinded her. The Invaders and the other Kid Commandos arrived just as U-Man and Lady Lotus' soldiers attempted to capture Golden girl, causing Lady Lotus to flee with U-Man.

Meanwhile, some of Lady Lotus' agents attempted to revive Baron Blood and when he came to, Lady Lotus directed him to the House of Lotus to join her forces. After bathing in lotus petals and scented water, Lady Lotus confronted Baron Blood and U-Man, and demonstrated to Baron Blood that she could control him as effectively as Dracula. She then provided him with a coffin and soil from England for him to rest in, and a new costume to replace his tattered garment. She then sent Baron Blood to help Master Man and Warrior Woman smuggle into America. The Invaders interfered but Baron Blood is still successful in the scheme.

Lady Lotus captured a number of men and women from Chinatown and hypnotized them to have the men serve as her guards and the women as her maids. With the four costumed Axis agents assembled, Lady Lotus declared that they would join forces as the Super-Axis. Warrior Woman and Master Man refused to obey a Japanese woman, but Lady Lotus drove them into compliance with hypnotic illusions.

Meanwhile, the Human Torch arrived at the House of Lotus, wondering if there was a connection to Lady Lotus. She greeted him and took control of him with hypnosis, offering her love to him, and playing on his feelings of rejection after Spitfire chose Captain America. She sent the Super-Axis and Human Torch to destroy Chicago's railroad center to hamper American supplies, and directed them mentally from a distance. When the Torch nearly killed Miss America and the Whizzer, Captain America was able to help him regain his senses. Angered at how she played with his emotions, the Torch attacked the House of Lotus solo. She sent her samurai to fight him, but he released a bright flash of light that broke her spell over them. Lady Lotus escaped during the melee. With the Super-Axis' defeat, Lady Lotus retreated into Chinatown. Days later, she chanced to encounter the Yellow Claw and his young niece, Suwan, in the rain. She was taken aback, thinking the Claw was only a legend. The Claw said that he admired her ambition, but promised that even if it took him another decade to it, he would be the one to conquer the United States.

U-Man later had his revenge upon Lady Lotus for making him her slave by raping her and she gave birth to his daughter, Nia.

Lady Lotus was revealed to be the true identity of contemporary Los Angeles crime lord "Lotus Newmark" in Captain America: Forever Allies #1 (2010). As Lotus Newmark, she had previously appeared in storylines in Avengers Spotlight (featuring Hawkeye, written by Steve Gerber), Wonder Man and Nomad.

Powers and abilities
Lady Lotus possesses the ability to hypnotize others from miles away, forcing them to obey her will. She can also psychically project images into a crystal ball, cast mental illusions and had limited powers of precognition. Exposure to lotus flowers heightened her powers, and she would bathe for an hour in a bath of the flowers to increase her abilities. Due to apparent mystical means, she also does not age.

References

External links
 Lady Lotus Marvel Wikia
 

Comics characters introduced in 1979
Fictional characters with precognition
Fictional characters with slowed ageing
Fictional hypnotists and indoctrinators
Fictional illusionists
Fictional Japanese people
Fictional secret agents and spies
Marvel Comics female supervillains
Marvel Comics characters who have mental powers
Marvel Comics telepaths
Marvel Comics mutants